The 2012 Women's World Junior Squash Championships is the women's edition of the 2012 World Junior Squash Championships, which serves as the individual world Junior championship for squash players. The event took place at the Khalifa International Tennis and Squash Complex in Doha in Qatar from 7 to 12 July 2012. Nour El Sherbini won her second World Junior Open title, defeating Yathreb Adel in the final.

Seeds

Draw and results

Finals

Top half

Section 1

Section 2

Bottom half

Section 1

Section 2

See also
Men's World Junior Squash Championships 2012
British Junior Open Squash
World Junior Squash Championships

References

External links
World Junior Squash Championships 2012 official website

2012 in squash